Kuchurhan is a village in Rozdilna Raion of Odesa Oblast in Ukraine. It is located along the Kuchurhan River at the north end of the Cuciurgan Reservoir along the border with Transnistria in Moldova. It is the site of highway, rail, and power line border crossings between Ukraine and Moldova. Kuchurhan belongs to Lymanske settlement hromada, one of the hromadas of Ukraine.

History 
The village was established in 1808 as Strassburg by Roman Catholic German and French Alsatian immigrants to the Kutschurgan Valley, then part of the Russian Empire.  It received its present name in 1944 after the remaining German residents were driven from the area by the advancing Soviet army.

Ukrainian 24 Kanal journalist Volodymyr Runets reported in March 2016 that Kuchurhan's schoolchildren were being taught anti-Americanism and that most villagers "loathe Ukrainian patriots".

See also
 Black Sea Germans
 Roads in Ukraine
 State Highways (Ukraine)
 Transport in Moldova
 Cuciurgan power station
 Eugeniu Știrbu

References

External links
  Kuchurhan
 Straßburg Village Information
 Kutschurgan Map
 Founders of the Village of Strassburg

Populated places established in 1808
Villages in Rozdilna Raion
Moldova–Ukraine border
Former German settlements in Odesa Oblast
1808 establishments in Ukraine